Bursa rugosa is a species of sea snail, a marine gastropod mollusk in the family Bursidae. 

The species occurs in Tanzania. The species is carnivorous and it reproduces sexually.

References

Bursidae
Gastropods described in 1835